Spirosomaceae is a family of bacteria in the phylum Bacteroidota.

Genera
The family Spirosomaceae comprises the following genera:

 Arcicella Nikitin et al. 2004
 Arcticibacterium Li et al. 2017
 Arsenicibacter Huang et al. 2017
 Dyadobacter Chelius and Triplett 2000
 Emticicia Saha and Chakrabarti 2006
 Fibrella Filippini et al. 2011
 Fibrisoma Filippini et al. 2011
 Flectobacillus Larkin et al. 1977 (Approved Lists 1980)
 Fluviimonas Sheu et al. 2013
 Huanghella Jiang et al. 2013
 Jiulongibacter Liu et al. 2016
 Lacihabitans Joung et al. 2014
 Larkinella Vancanneyt et al. 2006
 Leadbetterella Weon et al. 2005
 Nibrella Kang et al. 2013
 Persicitalea Yoon et al. 2007
 Pseudarcicella Kämpfer et al. 2012
 Ravibacter Chaudhary et al. 2017
 Rhabdobacter Dahal and Kim 2016
 Rudanella Weon et al. 2008
 Runella Larkin and Williams 1978 (Approved Lists 1980)
 Siphonobacter Táncsics et al. 2010
 Spirosoma Migula 1894 (Approved Lists 1980)
 Taeseokella Joung et al. 2015
 Telluribacter Lee et al. 2017

References

Cytophagia
Bacteria families
Gram-negative bacteria